Warken is a town in the commune of Ettelbruck, in central Luxembourg. Warken is a part of Ettelbruck and is split in five departments: Cité Bourschterbach, Cité Warkdall, Cité Breechen. rue de Welscheid and rue de Buerden.

References

Ettelbruck
Towns in Luxembourg